Rajagopalan Vasudevan, is an Indian scientist who has worked mainly in waste management. He is currently a professor in Thiagarajar College of Engineering.  He developed an innovative method to reuse plastic waste to construct better, more durable and very cost-effective roads. He thought up the idea of shredding plastic waste, mixing it with bitumen and using the polymerized mix in road construction. This method will help in making roads much faster and also will save environment from dangerous plastic waste. He also visited Mahatma schools on 15 April 2008. The roads also show greater resistance to damages caused by heavy rains. His road construction method is now widely used to construct roads in rural India. He was awarded India's fourth highest civilian honour Padma Shri in 2018.

Career 
He obtained his Bachelor of Science degree and M.Sc degree from the Madras University in 1965 and 1967 respectively. He also earned his Ph.D from the same university in 1974. Later in 1975, he joined Thiagarajar College of Engineering as Lecturer and became Professor in 1998.

Research 
His research mainly deals with waste management specifically use of waste plastics for road and building constructions.

References

External links 
 Thiagarajan, Kamala "The man who paves India's roads with old plastic" – The Guardian, 9 July 2018

Living people
University of Madras alumni
Scientists from Tamil Nadu
Year of birth missing (living people)
20th-century Indian chemists
Recipients of the Padma Shri in science & engineering
21st-century Indian chemists